Teri Hope (born Natalie Hope Reisberg on February 15, 1939) is an American model and actress. She was Playboy magazine's Playmate of the Month for the September 1958 issue. Her centerfold was photographed by Don Bronstein and Mike Shea.

Hope attended Carnegie Tech in Pittsburgh, Pennsylvania. While attending a Playboy-themed party at the Beta Sigma Rho (now merged with Pi Lambda Phi) fraternity house, chapter members proclaimed  her the "Party Playmate" and submitted her photos to Playboy.

Hope went on to enjoy a modest acting career in the 1960s, including appearances in two Elvis Presley movies, 1963's Fun in Acapulco and 1964's Roustabout.

Filmography

Films
 Pajama Party (1964)
 Roustabout (1964) (uncredited) as College student
 Fun in Acapulco (1963) as Janie Harkins
 Gypsy (1962) (uncredited)
 Force of Impulse (1961) as Bunny Reese

Television
 Hennesey - "The Best Man" (1962) (credited as Terry Hope) as Nurse
 The Gertrude Berg Show
 "Dad's Day" (1962-03-29) (credited as Terry Hope) as Susan
 "Goodbye, Mr. Howell" (1962-02-15) (credited as Teri Hope) as Susan

See also
 List of people in Playboy 1953–1959

References

External links
 
 

1939 births
Living people
1950s Playboy Playmates
Carnegie Mellon University alumni
American film actresses